This is a list of Ukrainian composers of classical music who were either born on the territory of modern-day Ukraine or were ethnically Ukrainian.

List by century of birth

15th century

16th century

17th century

18th century

19th century

20th century

Notes

References

Sources

Further reading

External links 

 Ukraine: Music – Britannica
 Free scores by Ukrainian composers at the International Music Score Library Project (IMSLP)
 Article on the National Union of Composers of Ukraine in Internet Encyclopaedia of Ukraine
 Explore Music by Ukrainian Composers from the Boosey & Hawkes website

Ukrainian
list
Composers